is a railway station on the Meitetsu Chikkō Line operated by the private railway operator  operated by Nagoya Railroad (Meitetsu) in Minato-ku, Nagoya, Aichi Prefecture, Japan.

Lines
Higashi Nagoyakō Station is served by the Meitetsu Chikkō Line, and is a terminal station for the line, located 1.5 km from the opposing terminus of the line at Ōe Station.

Layout
Higashi Nagoyakō Station has a single side platform.

Platforms

Adjacent stations

History
It was renamed Higashi Nagoyakō on January 30, 1932. The station has been unattended since December 16, 1935. On January 15, 2005, the Tranpass system of magnetic fare cards with automatic turnstiles was implemented.

References

External links

 Meitetsu Station information 

Railway stations in Japan opened in 1924
Stations of Nagoya Railroad
Railway stations in Aichi Prefecture